Louis Robert Wolheim (March 28, 1880 – February 18, 1931) was an American actor, of both stage and screen, whose rough physical appearance relegated him to roles mostly of thugs or villains in the movies, but whose talent allowed him to flourish on stage. His career was mostly contained during the silent era of the film industry, due to his untimely death at the age of 50 in 1931.

Early life
Born in New York City in 1880, he attended Cornell University, where he graduated with a degree in engineering. After graduation, he taught mathematics, including six years as an instructor at Cornell. He also worked as a mining engineer.  According to Wolheim, while at Cornell, he suffered an injury to his nose during a football game, and, after having the nose seen to by medical professionals, later that same day he got into a physical altercation (which he won), although his nose suffered more damage, ending up becoming almost a trademark for him. After the United States entrance into World War I, Wolheim joined the United States Army, and was in officers training at Camp Zachary Taylor in Louisville, Kentucky when hostilities ended. Not wanting to remain in the service as a career, he asked for and was granted a discharge.

According to Art Leibson's book Sam Dreben: The Fighting Jew (Westernlore Press, Tucson, Arizona 1996), just before World War I Wolheim was in Chihuahua, Mexico selling raincoats and rubber boots to revolutionaries, when he met Sam Dreben, an American mercenary. According to a 1933 article in Liberty Magazine by Tex O'Reilly. Wolheim and Dreben were noted for their drinking and fighting in Mexican cantinas. One time Wolheim beat up a Mexican officer and was put in jail. Dreben rushed to the prison and secured Wolheim's release. When Dreben died in 1925 on the West Coast, Wolheim was living there and served as one of his pallbearers.

Career
In 1914, on the advice of Lionel Barrymore and John Barrymore, Wolheim entered films. Both brothers also invited him to appear in the 1919 play The Jest in which the Barrymores co-starred.<ref>The Oxford Companion to the American Theatre c.1992 by Gerald Bordman</ref> He would appear in at least five films with Lionel Barrymore including a serial and four films with John Barrymore, The Test of Honor (1919), Dr Jekyll & Mr Hyde (1920), Sherlock Holmes (1922) and Tempest (1928). Wolheim appeared in two silent films with their sister Ethel Barrymore. Wolheim's fearsome visage almost immediately typecast him in roles as gangsters, executioners (as in D. W. Griffith's Orphans of the Storm) or prisoners. Towards the end of the 1920s, he occasionally broke out of these stereotypes and played a comic Russian officer in Tempest and a rambunctious Sergeant in Howard Hughes's Two Arabian Knights. He also played a Chaneyesque gangster in Hughes's splendidly photographed The Racket, a lost film for over 70 years recently rediscovered.

Beginning with his appearance in the Barrymores' play The Jest, Wolheim would appear in ten Broadway plays from 1919 through 1925. He received considerable acclaim as Yank in the original stage production of The Hairy Ape (1922) by Eugene O'Neill. His final play would be as the lead, Captain Flagg, in What Price Glory?, in 1925. The play would be made into a film a year later, with Victor McLaglen in the role of Flagg. In 1922, with his fluent French, Wolheim translated Henri Bernstein's play The Claw into English, which his friend Lionel Barrymore had a successful run on Broadway in.

Wolheim acted primarily in silent films, because of his sudden death at the close of the silent era, but he did appear in several talkies, including All Quiet on the Western Front and Danger Lights (both 1930) before he died. Wolheim was credited for a screenplay in addition to his acting career, for The Greatest Power, which starred none other than Ethel Barrymore. At the very end of his career, his final appearance was in The Sin Ship, which was also his only directing credit. The film was released in April 1931, after Wolheim's death, however after its completion, Wolheim had decided that directing was not for him, and had stated he would only act from that point forward.

According to the biography included in the DVD version of All Quiet on the Western Front, Wolheim wanted, at one point in his career, to play romantic leads instead of tough "heavies". To that end, he sought to have plastic surgery performed on his broken nose. Executives at United Artists successfully obtained a restraining order against him from doing so, however.

Off-screen, Wolheim had a reputation as a genuinely caring individual, so much so that after his death, when flowers were usually sent to the funeral, his friends and co-workers instead took up a collection and gave the money, in Wolheim's name, to a fund to feed the hungry. James R. Quirk, editor and president of Photoplay Magazine, said of Wolheim, "This is no attempt to glorify an actor who has passed on. It is the truth, every word of it. Louis Wolheim was one of the finest and most generous souls I have ever known." Wolheim was a member of The Lambs Club, which he had joined in 1925.

Death
While preparing to appear in the film The Front Page, Wolheim died suddenly on February 18, 1931, in Los Angeles. He had been losing drastic amounts of weight for the role, and news accounts from that time attributed his death to that weight loss. However, modern sources attribute his death to stomach cancer. He would be replaced in The Front Page's cast by Adolphe Menjou.  Wolheim is interred at Hollywood Forever Cemetery in Hollywood, CA.

Filmography
(filmography as per AFI database, except where otherwise noted)

 The Warning (1914) - Policeman (uncredited)
 The Romance of Elaine (1915, Serial) - (uncredited)
 Dorian's Divorce (1916) - Capt. Ross
 The Brand of Cowardice (1916) - Cpl. Mallin
 The Sunbeam (1916) - Biff the Brute
 The Greatest Power (1917, screenplay)
 The End of the Tour (1917)
 The Millionaire's Double (1917) - Bob Holloway
 The Eternal Mother (1917) - Bucky McGhee
 The Avenging Trail (1917) - Lefty Reed
 The Eyes of Mystery (1918) - Brad Tilton
 The House of Hate (1918 - film serial)
 Peg of the Pirates (1918) - Flatnose Tim (as L. Walheim)
 A Pair of Cupids (1918) aka. Both Members (reissue title) - Dirk Thomas
 The Poor Rich Man (1918) - Wrestler
 The Belle of the Season (1919) - Johnson
 The Carter Case (1919 - film serial) - Emanon
 The Test of Honor (1919) - Man/Devil in Dream(*uncredited)
 The Darkest Hour (1919) - Louis Marcotte
 Dr. Jekyll and Mr. Hyde (1920) - Dance Hall Proprietor 
 A Manhattan Knight (1920) - Mangus O'Shea
 Number 17 (1921)
 Experience (1921) - Crime
 Orphans of the Storm (1921) - Executioner
 Determination (1922)
 Sherlock Holmes (1922) - Craigin
 The Face in the Fog (1922) - Petrus
 Love's Old Sweet Song (1923) - The Wanderer — two-reeler filmed in Phonofilm sound-on-film system
 The Last Moment (1923) - The Finn
 The Go-Getter (1923) - Daniel Silver
 Little Old New York (1923) - The Hoboken Terror
 Unseeing Eyes (1923) - Laird
 The Uninvited Guest (1924) - Jan Boomer
 America (1924) - Capt. Hare
 The Story Without a Name (1924) - Kurder
 Lover's Island (1925) - Captain Joshua Dawson
 Two Arabian Knights (1927) - Sergeant Peter McGaffney
 Sorrell and Son (1927) - Buck
 Tempest (1928) - Sgt. Bulba
 The Racket (1928) - Nick Scarsi
 The Awakening (1928) - Le Bete
 The Shady Lady (1929) - Professor Holbrook
 Square Shoulders (1929) - Slag Collins
 Wolf Song (1929) - Gullion
 Frozen Justice (1929) - Duke
 Condemned (1929) - Jacques
 The Ship from Shanghai (1930) - Ted, the steward
 All Quiet on the Western Front (1930) - Stanislaus Katczinsky
 Danger Lights (1930) - Dan Thorn
 The Silver Horde (1930) - George Balt
 Gentleman's Fate (1931) - Frank
 The Sin Ship (1931) - Captain Sam McVey (also directed)

Stage career
(list as per Internet Broadway Database)

 The Jest (1919–20) - The Executioner
 The Letter of the Law (1920) - Bridet
 The Broken Wing (1920-1921) - General Panfilo Aguilar
 The Claw (1921-1922) - translation from French
 The Fair Circassian (1921) - The Prince Regent
 The Idle Inn (1921-1922) - Bendet
 The Hairy Ape (1922) - Yank
 MacBeth (1924) - Porter
 Catskill Dutch (1924) - Cobby
 What Price Glory?'' (1925) - Captain Flagg

References

Further reading

External links
 
 
 Louis Wolheim at Virtual History
 

1880 births
1931 deaths
Cornell Big Red football players
Deaths from stomach cancer
American male film actors
American male silent film actors
Burials at Hollywood Forever Cemetery
Deaths from cancer in California
Male actors from New York City
20th-century American male actors
Jewish American male actors
Members of The Lambs Club